Sivasspor Kulübü, known as Demir Grup Sivasspor due to sponsorship reasons, is a Turkish sports club based in Sivas. The primary department of the club is men's football. Formed in 1967, its football department has competed in Süper Lig since the 2017–18 season.

They competed for the Süper Lig title in two consecutive seasons (2007–08 and 2008–09), ultimately finishing fourth and second respectively. They also earned the fourth spot at the end of 2019–20 season. In all these seasons, they finished the first half of the league at the top of the league. They are one of three non-champion clubs that topped the first half, along with Altay and Kocaelispor. They were also fifth at the end of 2013–14 season. They were the champions of the 2021–22 Turkish Cup.

History
Sivasspor were originally formed on 14 May 1932 in Sivas as Sivas Gençlik. They sported Kırmızı-Beyaz (Red-White) shirts and Beyaz (White) shorts. They played many matches at the amateur level in their early years before they were allowed to play professionally. By the mid-1960s, Sivas Gençlik merged with Yolspor and Kızılırmak. They had hoped that this merger would help their push to join the professional leagues, the league closed their doors to Sivasspor once more.

There were several boycotts until 1 July 1967, when Sivasspor was allowed to play professional football in Turkey. Sivasspor started out in the Second League, White Group. On 17 September 1967, during a match against Kayseri Erciyesspor (then Kayserispor) played at the Kayseri Atatürk Stadium, a disaster occurred with 40 dead and at least 300 injuries among the fans, which was the worst sporting-related event in Turkey. Almost all casualties were Sivasspor fans, who perished in a stampede after chaos broke out in their ranks, due to attacking Kayserispor fans. The match was finished 1–0 in favour of the Kayseri side. After the disaster, Kayseri Erciyesspor and Sivasspor played different groups of the 2nd league until the 1990–91 season. That year, both teams reconciled and played in the Fourth Group of the Third League (now TFF Second League). Kayseri Erciyesspor were champions and promoted to Second League. 

Due to there being many new clubs, the Turkish Football Federation decided to create a third league. They were permitted into the Second League along with Afyonspor, Balıkesirspor, Giresunspor, Kastamonuspor, Malatyaspor, Orduspor, Uşakspor, and Taksim GK. During their first professional season, Sivasspor finished 16th in their group, a mere four points from relegation. They also finished in the bottom half of the table the following season. They came close to promotion to First League in 1971–72 and 1972–73 seasons but finished second behind Şekerspor and Adana Demirspor. 

Sivasspor would remain in the lower leagues until winning the Second League in 2005, gaining automatic promotion. The club finished 8th in their first season in the Süper Lig. Werner Lorant led the team to key victories over clubs like Beşiktaş and Gençlerbirliği. At the end of their first season in the top flight, they finished with a record of ten wins, thirteen draws, and eleven losses, totaling out to 43 points. The club then finished 4th in the 2007–08 season, finishing on the same number of points as the second and third place teams but with an inferior goal difference. Sivasspor had the championship in their sights until the penultimate match, when they were beaten 5–3 by eventual champions Galatasaray. The 2008–09 season saw them finish 2nd after leading the table for much of the season. After losing their final match of the season, they finished behind leaders Beşiktaş by 5 points. 

Sivasspor finished fourth in the 2019–20 Süper Lig season; hence, they qualified to the 2020–21 UEFA Europa League for the first time in their history.

On 26 May 2022, Sivasspor won their first major honour, the 2021–22 Turkish Cup in a 3–2 extra-time win over Kayserispor.

Honours

National competitions
 Süper Lig
 Runners-up (1): 2008–09
 TFF First League
 Winners (2): 2004–05, 2016–17
 TFF Third League
 Winners (1): 1998–99 (Group 2)
 Runners-up (2): 1988–1989 (Group 4), 1992–1993 (Group 6)

 Turkish Cup
 Winners (1): 2021–22

 Turkish Super Cup
 Runners-up: 2022

UEFA competitions
Intertoto Cup
 Runners-up (1): 2008

League participations 

 Turkish Super League: 2005–16, 2017–present
 TFF First League: 1967–83, 1984–86, 1999–05, 2016–17
 TFF Second League: 1986–99
 Amatör Futbol Ligleri: 1983–84

UEFA cups record

Players

Current squad

Out of squad

Out on loan

Current coaching staff

Coaching history

Presidential history

Sponsorships

Naming sponsorships

Kit sponsorships

Other departments

Sivasspor has got active departments in women's football (founded in 2021), billiards, bridge, judo, table tennis, swimming and Jereed, an ancient Turkic equestrian team sport.

References

Further reading
Başaran, Kenan (2017). Sivas-Kayseri; Türkiye'nin büyük futbol faciası. İletişim Yayınları. ISBN-13: 978-975-05-2270-3

External links
Official website 
Sivasspor on TFF.org

 
Association football clubs established in 1967
Sport in Sivas
Football clubs in Turkey
1967 establishments in Turkey
Süper Lig clubs